Alfred Rushforth (23 April 1898 – 30 December 1985) was an Australian cricketer. He played 24 first-class matches for Tasmania between 1922 and 1937.

For 25 years, Rushforth was employed by the Alexander Patent Racket Company in Launceston, Tasmania. In 1950, he was appointed general manager of the company, a position he held until his resignation in 1959.

See also
 List of Tasmanian representative cricketers

References

External links
 

1898 births
1985 deaths
Australian cricketers
Tasmania cricketers
Cricketers from Hobart